Luca Beccari (born 29 October 1974) is a Sammarinese politician who served as co-Captain Regent for a six-month term in 2014, alongside Valeria Ciavatta. He is a resident of Serravalle and a former official with the Central Bank of San Marino. He has been a Christian Democrat since 1993, and joined the Grand and General Council in 2012.

References

1974 births
Living people
People from the City of San Marino
Captains Regent of San Marino
Members of the Grand and General Council
Sammarinese Christian Democratic Party politicians
Secretaries of State for Foreign and Political Affairs of San Marino
University of Bologna alumni